Moustapha "Mous" Lamrabat (born 1983) is a Moroccan-born Belgian photographer, of Moroccan and Flemish descent. He is known for both fashion photography under Studio Mousmous, and fine art photography.

Biography 
Lamrabat was born in Temsaman, northern Morocco; at the age of 2 his family moved to Belgium. He grew up in Sint-Niklaas in a family of nine children. 

He studied interior design at Royal Academy of Fine Arts (KASK) in Ghent and graduated in 2009. He is self taught in the field of photography. 

In 2019, he had his first solo exhibition Mousganistan, held at the  museum in Sint-Niklaas. His fine art photography will often highlight his subjects donning niqabs, abayas, and kaftan robes. He creates hybrid images by using Islamic symbols, such as traditional clothing; and pairs it with Western brand iconography and pop culture references.

Lamrabat has worked for Elle, Vogue Italia, Vogue Arabia, GQ Middle East, and Esquire.

References 

1983 births
Living people
Moroccan photographers
Belgian photographers
Fashion photographers
Royal Academy of Fine Arts (Ghent) alumni
People from Sint-Niklaas